Axius may refer to:

Geography
 Orontes River, also known as Axios or Axius, river in Lebanon, Syria, and Turkey
 Vardar, also known as Axios or Axius, a river in Macedonia and Greece

People
 Members of the Axia gens, a plebeian family of ancient Rome

Other uses
 Axius (crustacean), a genus of decapods, also known as mud lobsters
 Axius (mythology), the god of the river Axius

See also
Axis (disambiguation)
Axios (disambiguation)